Georges Poitou (11 February 1926 – 14 December 1989) was a French mathematician.

1926 births
1989 deaths
École Normale Supérieure alumni
Academic staff of the Lille University of Science and Technology
Scientists from Paris
20th-century French mathematicians